Saskatchewan Gaming Corporation, trading as Sask Gaming, is a Crown corporation owned by the Government of Saskatchewan established in 1996. Overseen by the Saskatchewan Liquor and Gaming Authority (SLGA), it is the owner of Casino Regina and Casino Moose Jaw—the province's two commercial casinos.

In October 2008, the Saskatchewan Gaming Corporation was named one of "Canada's Top 100 Employers".

In October 2022, it was announced that Sask Gaming would be transferred to the new Lotteries and Gaming Saskatchewan (LGS) crown corporation in April 2023.

References

External links
  Saskatchewan Gaming Corporation

Gambling companies of Canada
Crown corporations of Saskatchewan
Companies based in Regina, Saskatchewan